John Oliver is an British-American comedian, political satirist, and talk show host, best known for Last Week Tonight with John Oliver (2014-present).

Major associations

Daytime Emmy Awards

Primetime Emmy Awards

Guild Awards

Producers Guild of America Awards

Writers Guild of America Awards

Other Awards

Critics' Choice Real TV Awards

Critics' Choice Television Awards

Dorian Awards

Environmental Media Awards

GLAAD Media Awards

MTV Movie & TV Awards

Peabody Award

People's Choice Awards

Television Critics Association Awards

Webby Awards

References 

Lists of awards received by person